This page is a list of countries which used the Bristol Beaufort, along with their units:

Operators

Australia
Royal Australian Air Force
No. 1 Squadron RAAF operated Beauforts between December 1943 and June 1945.
No. 2 Squadron RAAF operated Beauforts between December 1943 and September 1944.
No. 6 Squadron RAAF operated Beauforts between August 1943 and January 1946.
No. 7 Squadron RAAF operated Beauforts between December 1942 and December 1945.
No. 8 Squadron RAAF operated Beauforts between March 1943 and February 1946.
No. 13 Squadron RAAF operated Beauforts between August 1943 and May 1944.
No. 14 Squadron RAAF operated Beauforts between December 1942 and November 1945.
No. 15 Squadron RAAF operated Beauforts between January 1944 and November 1945.
No. 21 Squadron RAAF operated Beauforts between January and August 1946.
No. 22 Squadron RAAF operated Beauforts until October 1945.
No. 30 Squadron RAAF operated Beauforts in August 1942 and later between January 1944 and September 1945.
No. 31 Squadron RAAF operated Beauforts between August 1942 and October 1945.
No. 32 Squadron RAAF operated Beauforts between March 1943 and November 1945.
No. 36 Squadron RAAF operated Beauforts between March and June 1946.
No. 92 Squadron RAAF operated Beauforts between July and September 1945.
No. 93 Squadron RAAF operated Beauforts between July 1945 and May 1946.
No. 100 Squadron RAAF operated Beauforts between February 1942 and August 1946.
No. 1 Communication Unit RAAF
No. 3 Communication Unit RAAF
No. 4 Communication Unit RAAF
No. 5 Communication Unit RAAF
No. 6 Communication Unit RAAF
No. 8 Communication Unit RAAF
No. 11 Communication Unit RAAF
No. 9 Local Air Supply Unit RAAF
No. 10 Local Air Supply Unit RAAF
No. 12 Local Air Supply Unit RAAF
No. 1 Aircraft Performance Unit RAAF
No. 1 Operational Training Unit RAAF operated Beauforts between April 1942 and July 1946.
No. 5 Operational Training Unit RAAF operated Beauforts between October 1942 and February 1946.
No. 6 Operational Training Unit RAAF operated Beauforts between July 1943 and July 1944.

Canada
Royal Canadian Air Force
No. 149 Squadron RCAF operated Beauforts transferred from 32 (C) OTU between November 1942 and August 1943.
No. 415 Squadron RCAF operated Beauforts between September 1941 and January 1942.

New Zealand
New Zealand received six aircraft and after withdrawing the type from active service returned four aircraft to the RAF.

Royal New Zealand Air Force
No. 489 Squadron RNZAF operated Beauforts between August 1941 and April 1942.

South Africa
South Africa received 18 aircraft early 1941 and next 40 aircraft in June 1943.
South African Air Force
No. 16 Squadron SAAF operated Beauforts between September and November 1942 and later between June 1943 and February 1944.
No. 20 Squadron SAAF operated Beauforts between July and September 1942.
No. 22 Squadron SAAF operated Beauforts between August 1942 and February 1943.
No. 23 Squadron SAAF operated Beauforts between July 1942 and October 1943.
No. 36 Coastal Flight SAAF operated Beauforts between January and July 1942.
No. 37 Coastal Flight SAAF operated Beauforts between February and July 1942.

Turkey
At least eleven, but more likely twelve Beaufort IAs were delivered to Turkey in 1944 and another twelve were delivered in 1945. All twenty-four were assigned to 105 TRG TAF and were operated until 1950.

Turkish Air Force
105th Torpedo and Reconnaissance Group TAF operated Beauforts between February 1944 and 1950.

United Kingdom
Royal Air Force
No. 22 Squadron RAF operated Beauforts between November 1939 and August 1944
No. 39 Squadron RAF operated Beauforts between September 1941 and January 1944.
No. 42 Squadron RAF operated Beauforts between April 1940 and April 1943.
No. 47 Squadron RAF operated Beauforts between August 1942 and June 1943.
No. 48 Squadron RAF operated Beauforts between May and October 1940.
No. 69 Squadron RAF operated Beauforts between August and September 1941.
No. 86 Squadron RAF operated Beauforts between May 1941 and November 1943.
No. 100 Squadron RAF operated Beauforts between October 1941 and February 1942.
No. 217 Squadron RAF operated Beauforts between May 1940 and September 1944.
No. 235 Squadron RAF operated Beauforts between March 1944 and June 1944.
No. 511 Squadron RAF operated Beauforts between December 1942 and January 1943.
No. 222 Group Photographic Flight RAF operated Beauforts between June and December 1944.
No. 1 (Coastal) Operational Training Unit RAF operated Beauforts between April and November 1940.
No. 2 (Coastal) Operational Training Unit RAF operated Beauforts between September and December 1941 and later between January 1943 and May 1944.
No. 3 (Coastal) Operational Training Unit RAF operated Beauforts between November 1940 and August 1941.
No. 5 (Coastal) Operational Training Unit RAF operated Beauforts between August 1941 and November 1944.
No. 9 (Coastal) Operational Training Unit RAF operated Beauforts between July 1942 and August 1944.
No. 32 (Coastal) Operational Training Unit RAF operated Beauforts between September 1941 and April 1943.
No. 132 (Coastal) Operational Training Unit RAF operated Beauforts between July 1943 and May 1946.
No. 51 (Fighter) Operational Training Unit RAF operated Beauforts between January 1943 and March 1945.
No. 54 (Fighter) Operational Training Unit RAF operated Beauforts between January 1943 and June 1945.
No. 60 (Fighter) Operational Training Unit RAF operated Beauforts between July and August 1943.
No. 63 (Fighter) Operational Training Unit RAF operated Beauforts between August 1943 and July 1944.
No. 75 (Fighter) Operational Training Unit RAF operated Beauforts in 1943.
Torpedo Training Unit RAF operated Beauforts between June 1940 and November 1942.
No. 1 Torpedo Training Unit RAF operated Beauforts between January 1943 and March 1944.
No. 2 Torpedo Training Unit RAF operated Beauforts between January and September 1943.

Fleet Air Arm
 728 Naval Air Squadron operated Beauforts between October 1944 and September 1945.
 733 Naval Air Squadron operated Beauforts between February 1944 and June 1945.
 762 Naval Air Squadron operated Beauforts between March 1944 and March 1946.
 788 Naval Air Squadron operated Beauforts between early 1945 and June 1945.
 798 Naval Air Squadron operated Beauforts between October 1943 and March 1944.

See also
Bristol Beaufort

References

Notes

Bibliography

 Buttler, Tony. Bristol Beaufort (Warpaint Series No. 50). Luton, Warpaint Books Ltd., 2000. .
 Delve, Ken. The Source Book of the RAF. Shrewsbury, Airlife Publishing Ltd., 1994. .
 Halley, James J. The Squadrons of the Royal Air Force & Commonwealth 1918–1988. Tonbridge, Kent, UK: Air-Britain (Historians) Ltd., 1988. .
 Hayward, Roger. Beaufort File. Tonbridge, Kent, UK: Air-Britain (Historians) Ltd., 1990. .
 Jefford, C.G. RAF Squadrons, a Comprehensive Record of the Movement and Equipment of all RAF Squadrons and their Antecedents since 1912.  Shrewsbury, Airlife Publishing Ltd., 1998 (2nd edition 2001). .
 Robertson, Bruce. Beaufort Special. Shepperton, Surrey, UK: Ian Allan Ltd., 1976. .

Lists of military units and formations by aircraft
Beaufort